Erik Himle (10 April 1924 – 30 July 2008) was a Norwegian civil servant and politician for the Labour Party.

Himle graduated with the cand.oecon. degree in 1948, and from the NATO Defence College in 1957. He was never elected as a politician, but worked himself upwards as a civil servant in Norwegian government ministries.

During the third cabinet Gerhardsen he became state secretary to the Minister of Defense 1958–1961 and to the Minister of Transport 1962–1963. In the fourth cabinet Gerhardsen he was appointed Minister of Trade and Shipping 1963–1964 and Minister of Transport 1964–1965. His last period as a state secretary was in the Office of the Prime Minister during the first cabinet Bratteli from 1971 to 1972. He continued as the permanent under-secretary of state in the Ministry of Defence 1967–1971 and 1973–1978 and in the Ministry of Petroleum and Energy 1978–1988.

Eisenhower Fellowships selected Erik Himle in 1966 to represent Norway.

He was born in Fana, and eventually settled in Nesbru. He died there in 2008. He had three children with wife Else Winter.

References

1924 births
2008 deaths
Norwegian state secretaries
Labour Party (Norway) politicians
Norwegian civil servants
Ministers of Transport and Communications of Norway
Ministers of Trade and Shipping of Norway